Melanum is a genus of fly in the family Chloropidae.

References 

 Europe
 Nearctic

Chloropinae
Chloropidae genera